Transmembrane and coiled-coil domains 5A is a protein that in humans is encoded by the TMCO5A gene.

References

Further reading 

 
 

Genes on human chromosome 15